Mina Laličić, b. 14 January 1986, Titograd, Yugoslavia (now Podgorica, capital of Montenegro) is a Montenegrin singer.

Laličić won Idol Season 2, the Balkan version of Pop Idol, shown by BKTV. As BKTV closed down, she didn't release an associated album. She's currently touring Montenegrin clubs with her band Sunrise.

Mina Laličić Idol Serbia, Montenegro & Macedonia Performances
Semi Finals: If I Could Turn Back Time by Cher
Top 12: Steamy Window by Tina Turner
Top 11: Call Me by Blondie
Top 10: You're The One That I Want by John Travolta & Olivia Newton-John
Top 9: Outra Lagar by Salomé de Bahia
Top 8: Senke by Oktobar 1864
Top 7: I Don't Wanna Lose You by Tina Turner
Top 6: So Many Times by Gadjo
Top 5: Zombie by The Cranberries
Top 4: Change by Lisa Stansfield
Top 4: Strong Enough by Cher
Top 3: Laž by Aleksandra Radović
Top 3: Hide Your Heart by Kiss
Grand Final: Kao Da Luda Sam
Grand Final: Sky by Sonique
Grand Final: The Best by Tina Turner

References 

Idols (TV series) winners
1986 births
Living people
21st-century Montenegrin women singers